Dany Saadia is a Mexican filmmaker, screenwriter, podcaster and entrepreneur who won the 2008 Best Director Malaga Festival award as well as the Best Feature Film award at the Mostra de València (Spain).  he is the CEO of Dixo, the first and most relevant podcasting production company in Mexico.

Career

Genesis 3:19 
In 2003 he wrote and directed Genesis 3:19 a short film whose world premiere was at the 2004 Tribeca Film Festival.  The film won 'Best Screenplay' at the 2004 Rhode Island Film Festival, and 'Best Short Film' at the 2004 Austin Film Festival.

3:19 Nada Es Casualidad 

In 2006 he wrote and directed his first feature film, 3:19 Nada Es Casualidad, a Spanish-Mexican production, in Valencia, Spain. It starred Miguel Angel Silvestre, Felix Gomez, Juan Diaz, Barbara Goenaga and Diana Bracho. The soundtrack was scored by Robin Guthrie,  and edited by Ivan Aledo.

The world premiere of 3:19 Nada Es Casualidad was during the 2008 Santa Barbara International Film Festival.  The film earned a positive review from Variety film critic Robert Koehler.

During the festival run, 3:19 Nada Es Casualidad won 'Best Director' in the 2008 Málaga Spanish Film Festival, and won for 'Best Film' and for 'Best Actor' for Miguel Angel Silvestre in the 2008 Mostra de Valencia.

Faust Arp 
In 2008 he entered the Aniboom In Rainbows Contest to create a full-length animated video clip for Radiohead, and his video clip submission Faust Arp was one of the finalists of the In Rainbows Animated Music Video Contest.

Podcast production 
In 2005, Saadia founded Dixo, the first and leading network of podcasts and blogs in Mexico.

Filmography

Recognition 
In comparing 3:19 Nada Es Casualidad to Saadia's earlier work, Variety film critic Robert Koehler wrote "Saadia has built his feature on the groundwork of his 2004 short, Genesis 3:19, but the final work may be overbuilt," expanding, "Saadia's warm cast, full of youthful Spanish thesps (many direct from the Iberian tube), add a lightness of being to a film that gets a little too eager to fling ideas at the viewer."  However, he granted that "Production values add considerable allure to the brainy entertainment, decked out with an interesting score by the Cocteau Twins' Robin Guthrie."

Awards and nominations 
 2004, won 'Best Screenplay' at Rhode Island Film Festival for Genesis 3:19
 2004, won 'Best Narrative Short Film' at 'Austin Film Festival for Genesis 3:19
 2006, shortlisted for Best Short Fiction Film Short by  - Academy Awards for Genesis 3:19
 2008, won 'Best Director' at Málaga Spanish Film Festival for 3:19 Nada Es Casualidad
 2008, won 'Best Feature Film' at Mostra de Valencia for 3:19 Nada Es Casualidad
 2008, won 'Best Actor' for Miguel Angel Silvestreat at Mostra de Valencia for 3:19 Nada Es Casualidad

References

External links

SBCC's '3:19' Review

Mexican film directors
Mexican screenwriters
1969 births
Living people
New York Film Academy alumni